"Oh! Dance" is a song, and also the first and also the debut single, of Singaporean-Korean girl group, Skarf. The single has a total of four tracks, including "Oh! Dance". It was released on August 13, 2012.

Background and release
The single contains four tracks and the title track of the single "Oh! Dance". It was revealed that singer Jung Yeob and composer Eco Bridge are the composers for the single's title track and it was also the first time both have ever worked with a girl group.

The music video was released on August 11, 2012, through Alpha Entertainment's official YouTube channel.

Promotion
On August 17, 2012, Skarf started their promotions on Music Bank with their title song "Oh! Dance", it was also the first music program that the girls had ever performed on in South Korea.

Track list

Chart

References

External links
Alpha Entertainment official site

2012 songs
2012 debut singles
Korean-language songs